Wine gate may refer to:

The German Wine Gate, a stone gate marking the southern end of the German Wine Route in Schweigen-Rechtenbach
The Puerta del Vino (literally "Wine Gate"), an entrance gate in the Alhambra in Spain
La Puerta del Vino (The Wine Gate), one of Debussy's Preludes named for the Alhambra gate
The Porta del Vino (lit. "Wine Gate"), a gate inside Bolzano's cathedral in Italy
"Winegate", any of several scandals involving wine, especially the adulteration of wine; the "-gate" suffix derives from the American Watergate scandal